Grady Reynolds is a professional basketball player from Alabama. Reynolds attended and played on college teams including the 2003–04 St. John's Red Storm men's basketball team and the  2002–03 St. John's Red Storm men's basketball team. He was involved in an incident involving a female member of the school swim team. He left the team after players were involved in an off-the-court incident. After college he played professional basketball at AZS Koszalin.

Team history 
2000-2002: Southern Union State Community College
2002–2004: St. John's (NCAA)
2004–2005: Fjolnir
2005–2006: Klal Bituah Ramat-Hasharon
2006–2007: Polonia Warszawa
2008–2009: Znicz Jarosław
2009–2010: Faymasa Palencia
2010: Hebraica Macabi
2011: AZS Koszali

References

Living people
African-American basketball players
AZS Koszalin players
Small forwards
St. John's Red Storm men's basketball players
American men's basketball players
Year of birth missing (living people)
21st-century African-American people